Better by Far is the eighth studio album by Canterbury scene rock band Caravan.

Track listing 
All songs composed by Pye Hastings, except where noted.

Side one

Side two

Personnel 
Caravan
 Pye Hastings – vocals, guitars
 Geoff Richardson – viola, guitars, flute, sitar, mandolin, vocals
 Jan Schelhaas – keyboards, backing vocals
 Dek Messecar – bass, backing vocals
 Richard Coughlan – drums, percussion

Additional personnel
 Vicki Brown – vocals on "Give Me More"
 Fiona Hibbert – harp on "Man in a Car"
 Tony Visconti – recorders on "The Last Unicorn"; electric double bass on "Man in a Car"

Releases 
 1977: LP - Arista 4134
 1977: LP - Arista 1008
 2004: CD - Eclectic Discs 1018
 2005: CD - Eclectic Discs 1018
 2005: CD - Eclectic Discs 230456

References

External links
 
 Caravan - Better by Far (1977) album credits & releases at AllMusic.com
 Caravan - Better by Far (1977) album releases & credits at Discogs.com
 Caravan - Better by Far (1977) album to be listened as stream at Play.Spotify.com

Caravan (band) albums
1977 albums
Albums produced by Tony Visconti
Arista Records albums